Alliot is a surname. Notable people with the surname include:

Colette Alliot-Lugaz (born 1947), French soprano
Maurice Alliot (1903–1960), French Egyptologist
Michèle Alliot-Marie (born 1946), French politician
Philippe Alliot (born 1954), French racing driver
Cianna Alliot (born 2000), Dutch Scuba Diver